Baltia, Basilia or Abalus is a mythic island in northern Europe mentioned in Greco-Roman geography in the connection of amber.

It presumably corresponds to a territory near either the Baltic Sea or the North Sea, perhaps the coast of Prussia, the island of Gotland, Sweden, or of the Jutland Peninsula.

Sources
Pliny the Elder (HN. 4.95; 37.35-36)

Diodorus Siculus (v. 23):

See also
Amber Coast
Amber Road
Baltic (name)
Baltica

References

Classical geography
History of the Baltic Sea
Mythological islands